Cuyagua is a town located on the coast of Aragua state, Venezuela. Among its rivers are Pozo de Arena and Pozo San Pedro. It has a beach that has a heavy swell where it is practiced surf and bodyboard.

See also
 Tourism in Venezuela
 Geography of Venezuela

Beaches of Venezuela
Tourist attractions in Aragua
Populated places in Aragua